HMS Seahorse was a 44-gun  fifth-rate frigate built for the Royal Navy during the 1820s, one of three ships of the Andromeda sub-class. After completion in 1830, she was ordered to be converted into a steam-powered ship in 1845, but this did not happen for another decade.

Description
The Andromeda sub-class was a slightly enlarged and improved version of the Druid sub-class, with a more powerful armament. The ship's tonnage was 1211  tons burthen. The Andromeda sub-class was armed with twenty-six 18-pounder cannon on her gundeck, ten 32-pounder carronades and a pair of 68-pounder guns on her quarterdeck and four more 32-pounder carronades in the forecastle. The ships had a crew of 315 officers and ratings.

Construction and career
Seahorse, the ninth ship of her name to serve in the Royal Navy, was ordered on 9 January 1823, laid down in November 1826 at Pembroke Dockyard, Wales, and launched on 22 July 1830. She was completed for ordinary at Plymouth Dockyard in August 1830 and completely roofed over.

Notes

References

External links
 

Seringapatam-class frigate
1830 ships
Ships built in Pembroke Dock